This was the first edition of the tournament.

Illya Marchenko won the title after defeating Yannick Maden 4–6, 6–4, 6–3 in the final.

Seeds
All seeds receive a bye into the second round.

Draw

Finals

Top half

Section 1

Section 2

Bottom half

Section 3

Section 4

References

External links
Main draw
Qualifying draw

2019 ATP Challenger Tour